Hazrat Ali may refer to:

 Ali (600 or 601 or 607  – 661), son-in-law of Muhammad
 Hazrat Ali (Afghan politician) (born 1964)